Takahiro Yamada (born 9 June 1964) is a Japanese former gymnast who competed in the 1988 Summer Olympics.

References

1964 births
Living people
Japanese male artistic gymnasts
Olympic gymnasts of Japan
Gymnasts at the 1988 Summer Olympics
Olympic bronze medalists for Japan
Olympic medalists in gymnastics
Medalists at the 1988 Summer Olympics
20th-century Japanese people